Kurjenrahka National Park is a national park in Southwest Finland. The area consists mainly of bog but also includes primeval forests, some of which have been unmanaged for over 150 years. The Eurasian lynx is a permanent resident of Kurjenrahka, but brown bears and gray wolves have also been observed and are known to reside in areas within or close to the park. Marked trails in the general area extend to over 300 km.

In Middle Ages the forests were jointly owned by the local parish. In early 1800s two manors bought them, but they had financially hard times and had to sell them to the state before end of the 19th century. Before selling, they logged clear all areas with easy access, but some islands in middle of mires remained unlogged.

See also 
 List of national parks of Finland
 Protected areas of Finland

References

External links
 
 
 Outdoors.fi – Kurjenrahka National Park

Protected areas established in 1998
Geography of Southwest Finland
Mynämäki
Aura, Finland
Tourist attractions in Turku
Tourist attractions in Southwest Finland
National parks of Finland
1998 establishments in Finland